Şule Kut is the Rector of Okan University. Until 2010, she worked in Istanbul Bilgi University as a professor in International Relations, specifically on Turkish politics and the Balkans. She had been the Dean of the Faculty of Economics and Administrative Sciences in Bilgi University; and for 1999-2005 she was the Vice-Rector there. She has double B.A. degrees with Political Science and International Relations and Business Administration from  Boğaziçi University, and  master's  and PhD (1987) degrees  from the Binghamton University.

Among her books are:
Bağımsızlığın İlk Yılları: Azerbaycan, Kazakistan, Kırgızistan, Özbekistan, Türkmenistan (1994), 
Dağılan Yugoslavya ve Bosna-Hersek: Olaylar-Belgeler 1990-1996 (1997), 
En Uzun On Yıl: Türkiye’nin Ulusal Güvenlik ve Dış Politika Gündeminde Doksanlar (1998, 2000)
Balkanlar'da Kimlik ve Egemenlik (2005)

References

External links
 Official page at University (in Turkish)

Living people
Place of birth missing (living people)
Rectors of universities and colleges in Turkey
Turkish women academics
Academic staff of Istanbul Bilgi University
Binghamton University alumni
Women heads of universities and colleges
Year of birth missing (living people)
Academic staff of Istanbul Okan University